The Council of Australian Law Deans  (CALD) is an unincorporated association and the peak body of Australian law schools.

External links
 http://www.cald.asn.au/ CALD home page
 
 

College and university associations and consortia in Australia
Legal education in Australia